The masked bunting (Emberiza personata) is a passerine bird in the bunting family Emberizidae. It is found in Sakhalin, the Kuril Islands, and Japan.

The masked bunting was formerly considered as a subspecies of the black-faced bunting (Emberiza spodocephala) but is now treated as a separate species based on morphological and genetic differences. The species is monotypic: no subspecies are recognised.

References

Emberiza
Birds described in 1836
Taxa named by Coenraad Jacob Temminck